Jo Brand's Big Splash is a British television series produced by Doghouse Media and What Larks! Productions for Dave. The show was part of Dave's investment into original comedy shows. Presented by comedian Jo Brand, it combined her stand-up comedy with various tasks involving water. The first episode originally aired on 22 September 2011 and the last episode aired on 20 October 2011.

Overview
Jo Brand performs a stand-up comedy routine to a live studio audience at the Hackney Empire, this is combined with specially shot films of Brand visiting various people in the United Kingdom who possessed a passionate love of water. In each episode, another comedian joined Brand to take part in a water related task. The final episode was an extended compilation of all the stand up sections of the series.

Episode list

References

External links

2011 British television series debuts
2011 British television series endings
British stand-up comedy television series
Dave (TV channel) original programming